Dr. Anton Jerger of Vienna was a philatelist who, in 1983, was awarded the Crawford Medal by the Royal Philatelic Society London for his handbooks on the philately of Austrian Lombardy-Venetia. He amassed a world class collection of this area over fifty years with his wife Elisabeth. The collection was sold in instalments by Corinphila with the first instalment alone raising $1,800,000.

In 1984, Dr. Jerger was the first Austrian to be elected to the Roll of Distinguished Philatelists.

References

Austrian philatelists
Philately of Austria
Year of birth missing
Year of death missing
Fellows of the Royal Philatelic Society London
Signatories to the Roll of Distinguished Philatelists